Građanski list (Civic paper) was a daily newspaper published in Novi Sad, Serbia. 

It published information about life in Vojvodina and the region, politics, culture, daily life, etc. The weekend issue had ads and a guide for the weekly TV schedule and information about cultural events in Novi Sad.

The first issue was published in December 2000. The paper folded in 2010.

External links
Official website (in Serbian)

Newspapers established in 2000
Publications disestablished in 2010
Defunct newspapers published in Serbia
Culture of Vojvodina
Mass media in Novi Sad